Jean-Charles Trouabal (born 20 May 1965 in Paris) is a retired French sprinter who specialized in the 200 metres.

At the 1990 European Athletics Championships in Split the French team of Max Morinière, Daniel Sangouma, Trouabal and Bruno Marie-Rose improved the world record to 37.79 seconds. The record stood less than one year, as the Santa Monica Track Club from the United States team ran in 37.67 seconds at the 1991 Weltklasse Zurich meet.

He was born on the same day (20 May 1965) as his teammate Bruno Marie-Rose.

International competitions

1Disqualified in the semifinals
2Did not finish in the semifinals

References

External links

1965 births
Living people
Athletes from Paris
French male sprinters
Olympic athletes of France
Athletes (track and field) at the 1988 Summer Olympics
Athletes (track and field) at the 1992 Summer Olympics
World Athletics Championships athletes for France
World Athletics Championships medalists
European Athletics Championships medalists
Universiade medalists in athletics (track and field)
Mediterranean Games gold medalists for France
Mediterranean Games silver medalists for France
Mediterranean Games bronze medalists for France
Mediterranean Games medalists in athletics
Athletes (track and field) at the 1987 Mediterranean Games
Athletes (track and field) at the 1993 Mediterranean Games
Universiade silver medalists for France
Universiade bronze medalists for France
Medalists at the 1987 Summer Universiade
Medalists at the 1989 Summer Universiade